McIvor Jackson (24 May 1880 – 15 June 1936) was an English cricketer. He played eleven first-class matches for Surrey between 1903 and 1907.

See also
 List of Surrey County Cricket Club players

References

External links
 

1880 births
1936 deaths
Cricketers from Greater London
English cricketers
People from Merton (parish)
Surrey cricketers